Zachary Plavsic (born January 15, 1983) is a Canadian windsurfer of Serbian background. Plavsic was born and raised in the city of Vancouver, BC, Canada. He has represented Canada in two Olympic Games. In the 2008 Summer Olympics in Beijing, China, Plavsic finished 23rd. In the 2012 Summer Olympics in London, United Kingdom, Plavsic placed in 8th. In the 2011 ISAF Sailing World Cup, Plavsic finished Second and at the 2011 ISAF Sailing World Championships, Plavsic finished in 12th spot.

References

1983 births
Living people
Sportspeople from Vancouver
Canadian windsurfers
Olympic sailors of Canada
Canadian male sailors (sport)
Sailors at the 2008 Summer Olympics – RS:X
Sailors at the 2012 Summer Olympics – RS:X
Canadian people of Serbian descent
Sailors at the 2015 Pan American Games
Pan American Games competitors for Canada